Giona is a settlement in the Xanthi regional unit of Greece, part of the community of Avdira. It is located 9 kilometers northwest of Avdira, 9 kilometers northwest of Magiko, 11 kilometers northeast of Genisea, 7 kilometers west of Exochi, 4 kilometers east southeast of Pezoula, and 18.2 kilometers from Xanthi. In 1991, the population of Giona was around 154 inhabitants.

External links
Greek Travel Pages - Giona

Populated places in Xanthi (regional unit)